The White Land (Spanish: Las tierras blancas) is a 1959 Argentine drama film directed by Hugo del Carril and starring del Carril, Ricardo Trigo and Amanda Silva. It is based on a novel by Juan José Manauta. It is set in a poor village in Santiago del Estero Province in Northern Argentina, where the semi-desert climate gives much of the landscape a whitish appearance alluded to in the title.

Cast
 Hugo del Carril as Natalio 
 Ricardo Trigo as A Countryman 
 Amanda Silva as The Mother 
 Nora Palmer as Angelina 
 Carlos Olivieri as Odiseo 
 Raúl del Valle as The Bully  
 Juan José Manauta as The Teacher 
 Totón Podestá 
 Antonio Capuano 
 Mónica Cristina Ramos 
 Juan Armendáriz 
 David Socco

References

Bibliography 
 Borrás, Eduardo. Las aguas bajan turbias. Editorial Biblos, 2006.
 Cabrera, Gustavo. Hugo del Carril: un hombre de nuestro cine. Ediciones Culturales Argentinas, 1989.

External links 

1959 films
Argentine drama films
1959 drama films
1950s Spanish-language films
Films directed by Hugo del Carril
1950s Argentine films